Noureddine Maurice Bentoumi (born 19 February 1972) is an Algerian former cross-country skier. He competed in the men's 50 kilometre freestyle event at the 2006 Winter Olympics.

References

External links
 

1972 births
21st-century Algerian people
Algerian male cross-country skiers
cross-country skiers at the 2006 Winter Olympics
living people
Olympic cross-country skiers of Algeria